The Two Faces of Dr. Jekyll is a 1960 British horror film produced by Hammer Film Productions. It was directed by Terence Fisher, and stars Paul Massie as Dr. Jekyll, and co-stars Dawn Addams, Christopher Lee and David Kossoff. The screenplay was written by Wolf Mankowitz, based on the 1886 novella Strange Case of Dr Jekyll and Mr Hyde by Robert Louis Stevenson.

In contrast to other film versions, Jekyll was portrayed as a rather bland and faceless person, while Hyde was presented as suave and handsome. This reflects director Fisher's belief in what critics (such as biographer Wheeler Winston Dixon) called "the charm of evil". The film is unusual in that it was one of the few adaptations of the story where the Jekyll/Hyde character does not die in the story's conclusion. It is also set 12 years before the publication of Stevenson's novella.

The Two Faces of Dr. Jekyll was released in North America to theaters by American International Pictures under the titles House of Fright and Jekyll's Inferno and on American TV under its original British title.

Plot
In London in 1874, Dr. Henry Jekyll's wife, Kitty, is secretly involved with his friend Paul Allen (who hounds money from Jekyll). Ignoring the warnings of his colleague and friend Dr. Ernst Littauer, the middle-aged, mild-mannered Jekyll concocts a chemical potion which he hopes will help him learn the depths of the human mind.

By testing the potion on himself, he transforms into Mr. Edward Hyde, a young and handsome but also murderous and lecherous man. Soon, Hyde becomes bored with conventional debauchery and when he sets his eyes on Kitty, he decides he must have her. When Kitty rejects him, Hyde rapes her and leaves her unconscious. When Kitty wakes up in the bed, she immediately notices that Hyde has scratched her neck in various places. Distressed, Kitty walks over to the table, where she finds a note written to her. When Kitty goes into the other room looking for Paul, she looks in to find out that her lover has been bitten by a venomous snake. To Kitty's misfortune, Paul is dead. Kitty walks over to the patio, puts her leg over the balcony, covers her ears in response to the loud music playing from the party and allows herself to fall off the balcony and through the glass roof covering the party guests. Hyde frames his other self for these crimes.

The next day, Jekyll is horrified to learn of what Hyde has done. After speaking to his other half via a mirror, Jekyll turns uncontrollably into Hyde. Hyde then kills a man in Jekyll's laboratory by shooting him in the back and sets his body up on a desk. Hyde then sets fire to the laboratory as the police arrive. Via a window, Hyde pretends that Jekyll is trying to kill him as the building burns. After escaping the building, Hyde claims Jekyll tried to kill Hyde and ended up shooting himself due to madness as the innocent man and Jekyll's laboratory burns.

A few hours later, Hyde is summoned to the police station where he and some officers discuss the crime. After declaring Dr. Jekyll responsible for the crimes, Hyde tries to leave the building, but at the last minute Jekyll fights him from the inside and takes over again. As Dr. Jekyll sits on a bench, he is surrounded by astonished people and arrested for his alleged crimes.

Cast
Paul Massie as Dr. Henry Jekyll/Mr. Edward Hyde
Dawn Addams as Kitty Jekyll
Christopher Lee as Paul Allen
David Kossoff as Dr. Littauer
Francis de Wolff as Inspector
Norma Marla as Maria
Magda Miller as Sphinx Girl (uncredited)
Oliver Reed as Nightclub Bouncer (uncredited)
William Kendall as Clubman (uncredited)
Helen Goss as Nanny (uncredited)
Pauline Shepherd as Prostitute (uncredited)
Percy Cartwright as Coroner (uncredited)
Joe Robinson as Corinthian (uncredited)
Arthur Lovegrove as Cabby (uncredited)
Felix Felton as First Gambler (uncredited)

Production
The film was to star Louis Jourdan. Argentinian actress Isabel Sarli was offered a role in the film. Filming occurred at Bray Studios in Berkshire.

Dr. Jekyll has brown eyes and wears a full beard with rather long hair and bushy eyebrows, whereas Mr. Hyde is blue-eyed, clean shaven and has a shorter haircut - beyond this, their physical appearance is nearly identical, making this portrayal different than the bulk of film adaptations of the novel. However the story is presented as though Hyde looks different enough from Jekyll that even Mrs. Jekyll notices no resemblance.

Reception
Reviews were mixed to negative. The Monthly Film Bulletin of the U.K. wrote that the film "may be forgiven for tampering with a classic, but not for doing so with such a depressing lack of either wit or competence...Silliness, in fact, has got the better of the film to such an extent that even its most calculatedly vicious episodes appear only mildly grotesque. The production, which uses up colour film lavishly on such episodes as a cancan sequence, is otherwise hard-up for ideas." Variety gave the film a good review, praising Paul Massie for an "interesting performance" and Jack Asher for "colorful and sure" camerawork. Eugene Archer of The New York Times called the film "lurid", and Massie "frankly ridiculous." Harrison's Reports graded the film as "Fair", adding, "Horror fans will hardly be scared by this well-mounted British import...Paul Massie does the best he can in the poorly written twin role."

The film lost Hammer an estimated £30,000.

Potential Remake
In the mid-nineties, writer Denis Meikle wrote a potential remake under the suggestion of producer Michael Carreras. The script, titled Hyde: Monster of Desire, was briefly considered at 20th Century Fox before being revived at Dreamscape Pictures, with the idea of it being a $50 million picture with Sean Connery as Jekyll/Hyde. Ultimately, the critical and commercial flop of Mary Reilly, TriStar Picture's own Jekyll and Hyde film, and the dissolution of Dreamscape ended the project. The script is currently available on Meikle's website.

See also
The Face of Another, (1966) another film about a man who has an affair with his estranged wife by changing his face

References

External links

 
 

1960s English-language films
1960 horror films
1960 films
Hammer Film Productions horror films
Films shot at Associated British Studios
Dr. Jekyll and Mr. Hyde films
Films based on horror novels
Films directed by Terence Fisher
Films with screenplays by Wolf Mankowitz
Films shot at Bray Studios
Films scored by Monty Norman
1960s British films